Henry Bird Lee (1781 - September 16, 1816) was an American lawyer and politician.

Born in Greene County, New York, Lee practiced law in Patterson, New York. In 1815, Lee served in the New York State Assembly. In 1816, Lee was elected as a Democratic-Republican to the United States House of Representatives; Lee died before he took office.

See also
List of members-elect of the United States House of Representatives who never took their seats

Notes

1781 births
1816 deaths
19th-century American lawyers
19th-century American politicians
Elected officials who died without taking their seats
Members of the New York State Assembly
New York (state) Democratic-Republicans
New York (state) lawyers
People from Greene County, New York
People from Patterson, New York